Six-Year Plan (1950–1955) was the second - after the Three-Year Plan (1947–1949) - centralized plan of the People's Republic of Poland. It concentrated on increasing the heavy industry sector.

By 1950 the Polish government was dominated by Stalinist hardliners, such as Hilary Minc, and liberal economists responsible for creation of the Three-Year Plan were no longer influencing government policy. The Six-Year Plan, designed to bring the economy of Poland in line with the Soviet economy, concentrated on heavy industrialization, with projects such as Nowa Huta. The plan was accepted by the Sejm on July 21, 1950. Later on, it was modified several times, and never fully completed. 

Polish society paid a heavy price for badly thought-out and quick industrialization. Living standards were reduced, since investments in other fields, such as construction, were cut. In agriculture, the idea of collectivization was promoted, to the protests of Polish farmers. The plan was fashioned after similar Soviet plans, and was based on certain Soviet-style principles, such as central planning of economy, limiting the so-called Capitalist elements, and close cooperation with other Eastern Bloc nations. New urban districts were built in big cities, attracting residents of overpopulated villages. At the same time, however, the balance between supply and demand deepened, and shortages of basic products were common. As a result, rationing was re-introduced in the early 1950s. 

The only real achievement of the Six-Year Plan was quick development of heavy industry. At the same time, however, other fields of Polish economy, such as services and food industry, remained underdeveloped, as all state funds were directed at construction of shipyards, steel plants, chemical plants and car factories. Among major investments of the plan are:

 Skawina Aluminum Factory,
 development of Oswiecim Chemical Works (formerly Buna Werke),
 development of Zaklady Azotowe Kedzierzyn (formerly IG Farben Heydebreck),
 development of Synthetic Fibres Plant Stilon Gorzow Wielkopolski (formerly IG Farben-Werks Landsberg (Warthe)),
 Shoe Factory at Nowy Targ,
 Lenin Steelworks at Nowa Huta,
 Warsaw Steelworks,
 FSO Warszawa,
 FSC Lublin,
 FSC Star at Starachowice,
 Wierzbica Cement Plant,
 development of Jaworzno Power Station,
 development of Czestochowa Steelworks,
 development of Gdansk Shipyard (formerly Schichau-Werft and Danziger Werft),
 development of Szczecin Shipyard (formerly AG Vulcan Stettin). 

Economic history of Poland
Economic planning
1950s in Poland